Flersguterjunge is the fifth studio album by German rapper Fler, released on 11 June 2010 via ersguterjunge in both a standard and premium edition.

Background
After the exit of Aggro Berlin and the reconciliation with his friend Bushido in early 2009, Fler joined ersguterjunge and later signed an author contract. He and Bushido then worked on Carlo Cokxxx Nutten 2, which released in September 2009. The only single "Eine Chance/Zu Gangsta" ranked No. 26 in the Media Control Charts and stayed seven weeks in the top 100.

According to Fler, he had he changed his rap style before the producing of the album. In an interview with Mixery Raw Deluxe, he explained that he chose the title Flersguterjunge (meaning "Fler is a good boy") to show that he had left his Aggro Berlin past behind.

Chart performance and singles
Flersguterjunge entered the German Albums Chart at No. 4. In the following weeks, the album ranked No. 35, No. 57 and No. 72, before it left the top 100.

"Das alles ist Deutschland" was released as the album's lead single on 2 June 2010. The single features vocals of Bushido and singer Sebastian Krumbiegel, who reinterpreted the chorus of his group Die Prinzen's song "Deutschland". The music video was celebrate a day before its premier. The single entered the German singles chart at No. 28 and stayed five weeks in the top 100.

A video was shot for "Mit dem BMW/Flersguterjunge" and released as a so-called "street single".

Track listing
All songs are produced by Djorkaeff and Beatzarre, except track 20 (Michael Popescu).
The tracks 10, 18, 20 and 21 are only featured on the premium edition.

Samples
"Flersguterjunge" contains samples of "Ein Mann Armee" by Bushido, "Komm klar, Spast" by Bushido & Fler and the "Yeah! Woo!" from "Think (About It)" by Lyn Collins
"Das alles ist Deutschland" contains a sample of "Deutschland" by Die Prinzen
"Kopfgefickt" contains a sample of "Secret Robes" by Matthew Corbett & Mike Wilkie
"Russisch Roulette" contains a sample of "Timeless" by Lee Groves & Peter Marett
"Mit dem BMW" contains samples of "Carlo Cokxxx Flashback" by Bushido & Fler

References

Fler albums
German-language albums
2010 albums